Tadjellet is a settlement in the Sahara Desert in southern central Algeria.

Geography of Tamanrasset Province